Alicia Tully Jensen (born December 2, 1963) is a model and an actress. She has been on the cover of Playboy,  Vogue, Cosmopolitan, Elle, and Mademoiselle magazines.

Early life and family
Jensen, born (youngest of four girls) into a career military home, was raised in Europe and is of English and Scottish descent on her mother's side and of English, Filipino, and Spanish descent on her father's side.

Career

She has appeared in the films One Long Day, Anni 50, The Family Web, Not even the Trees, The Brady Bunch Movie, Inside the Goldmine, and A letter to True. She has also been on the television series Wild Oats and Sex and the City.

Personal life
She was married to Antonio Sabàto Jr., and was on the 2009 VH1 show My Antonio trying to win him back. She was eliminated in the ninth episode, finishing in third place.

Filmography
Inside the Goldmine (1994) (Emily) (as Alicia Tully Jensen)
The Brady Bunch Movie (1995) (Model) (as Alicia Tully Jensen)
Sex and the City (1998) (Yvette)
Anni '50 (1998) (Martine) (as Alicia Tully Jensen)
The Family Web (1998) (as Alicia Tully Jensen)
Not Even the Trees (1998) (as Alicia Tully Jensen)
One Long Day (2004) (as Alicia Tully Jensen)

References

External links
 

1963 births
American film actresses
American female models
American actresses of Filipino descent
Living people
American people of Scottish descent
American people of English descent
American people of Spanish descent
American television actresses
Place of birth missing (living people)
Participants in American reality television series
21st-century American women